Caleb Charles Gindl (born August 31, 1988) is an American professional baseball outfielder who is a free agent. He has played in Major League Baseball (MLB) for the Milwaukee Brewers.

Career
Gindl attended Pace High School in Pace, Florida.

Milwaukee Brewers
Milwaukee selected Gindl in the fifth round of the 2007 Major League Baseball Draft. That year, he played for the Rookie league Helena Brewers, where in 55 games, he hit .372 with 5 HR, 42 RBI and 22 doubles. He was a Pioneer League Post-Season All-Star, along with fellow Brewers Jonathan Lucroy, Eric Farris and Roque Mercedes. He played the entire 2008 season with the Class A West Virginia Power, where in 137 games, he hit .307 with 13 HR, 81 RBI, 38 doubles, 86 runs and 14 SB, and was again a Post-Season All-Star. After the season, he played for the West Oahu CaneFires of Hawaii Winter Baseball, where he hit .281 with 3 HR and 18 RBI in 25 games. In 2009, he was promoted to the Class A-Advanced Brevard County Manatees, where in 112 games, he hit .277 with 17 HR, 71 RBI and 18 SB, and he was a Mid and Post-Season All-Star. Gindl spent the entire 2010 season with the Double-A Huntsville Stars, where in 128 games, he hit .272 with 9 HR, 60 RBI and 33 doubles. After the season, he played for Surprise in the Arizona Fall League, where in 16 games, he hit .259 with 2 HR, 6 RBI and 11 runs, and he was named an AFL Rising Star, along with fellow Brewer Jeremy Jeffress. He received an invitation to major league spring training with the Brewers in 2011. Gindl played 2011 with Triple-A Nashville, where in 126 games, he hit .307 with 15 HR, 60 RBI, 84 runs and 63 walks. In 2012 with Nashville, Gindl hit .261 with 12 HR and 50 RBI in 127 games. Gindl began 2013 with Nashville, where he was hitting .274 with 8 HR and 38 RBI before being recalled.

The Brewers promoted Gindl to the major leagues on June 15, replacing Ryan Braun. He recorded his first major league hit, a pinch-hit single off Tim Hudson of the Braves, on June 22. He was used off the bench and in left field, along with Logan Schafer in his first stint up. On June 29, Gindl was optioned to make room for Tyler Thornburg. He hit 5-20 with 1 RBI in his first stint. On July 11, Gindl was recalled, replacing the previous day's starter, Johnny Hellweg. On July 21, Gindl hit his first career home run, a walk-off homer in the bottom of the 13th inning to seal a 1-0 win against the Miami Marlins. He became the first Brewer in franchise history to record a walk off home run as their first home run. He was again used mostly off the bench, but he also got starts at left, along with Schafer and Khris Davis, and was occasionally used in right field in lieu of Norichika Aoki. In 57 games with Milwaukee, he hit .242 with 5 HR, 14 RBI, 17 runs and 20 walks.

Gindl was designated for assignment by the Brewers on September 2, 2014.

Toronto Blue Jays
He signed a minor league contract with the Toronto Blue Jays on December 12. He elected free agency on November 6, 2015.

Lancaster Barnstormers
On March 22, 2016, Gindl signed with the Lancaster Barnstormers of the Atlantic League of Professional Baseball.

Chicago White Sox
On December 13, 2016, Gindl signed a minor league contract with the Chicago White Sox. He was released in March 2017.

San Francisco Giants
On July 16, 2017, Gindl signed a minor league deal with the San Francisco Giants. He was released on September 6, 2017. On September 17, 2017, he resigned a minor league deal  with the 
San Francisco Giants He became a free agent after the 2018 season.

Second stint with Lancaster Barnstormers
On April 9, 2019, Gindl signed with the Lancaster Barnstormers of the Atlantic League of Professional Baseball. He became a free agent following the season. On March 12, 2020, Gindl re-signed with the Barnstormers for the 2020 season as a player-coach. However, the season was canceled due to the COVID-19 pandemic and he became a free agent after the season.

On April 28, 2021, Gindl re-signed with the Barnstormers for the 2021 season. On June 29, Gindl set a Barnstormers franchise record by homering in seven straight games, breaking a mark previously held by Ryan Harvey. He became a free agent following the season where he appeared in 115 games batting .291/.392/.578 with 34 home runs and 91 RBIs.

References

External links

1988 births
Living people
Baseball players from Pensacola, Florida
Brevard County Manatees players
Buffalo Bisons (minor league) players
Helena Brewers players
Huntsville Stars players
Leones del Caracas players
American expatriate baseball players in Venezuela
Major League Baseball outfielders
Milwaukee Brewers players
Nashville Sounds players
Richmond Flying Squirrels players
Sacramento River Cats players
Surprise Rafters players
West Oahu Canefires players
West Virginia Power players
Lancaster Barnstormers players
People from Escambia County, Florida